Her Code of Honor is a 1919 American silent drama film directed by John M. Stahl and starring Florence Reed. Its alternate title was The Call of the Heart. A print of it is held by the British Film Institute's National Film and Television Archive in London.

Plot
As described in a film magazine, Alice (Reed), who innocently uses a surname not her own, becomes engaged to Eugene La Salle (Desmond), whom she meets following an automobile accident. He attends a house party at the home of her benefactor Tom Davis (Francis), a man whose love for her mother Helen (Reed) allowed him to raise her from babyhood. On a moonlit night the passion between Alice and Eugene overcomes their patience. Eugene goes abroad for a few months and on his return finds that Alice is pregnant. They agree to be married the next day. However, by reason of the ring from his father Jacques (Cummings) which he exhibits, a duplicate of one left to Alice by her mother Helen, it appears that they are half-brother and sister. She asks Eugene to shoot her and just before he does they learn that he is an adopted son of his father. They then decide to get married as planned.

Cast
Florence Reed as Helen / Alice
William Desmond as Eugene La Salle
Robert Frazer as Richard Bentham
Irving Cummings as Jacques
Alec B. Francis as Tom Davis
Marcelle Roussillon as Jane
George Stevens (undetermined role)

References

External links

1919 films
American silent feature films
Films directed by John M. Stahl
American black-and-white films
Silent American drama films
1919 drama films
1910s American films